The 2008 San Diego mayoral election was held on Tuesday, June 3, 2008, to elect the mayor for San Diego. Incumbent mayor Jerry Sanders ran for a second term as mayor against field of four other candidates.

Municipal elections in California are officially non-partisan, though some candidates do receive funding and support from various political parties. The non-partisan primary was held Tuesday, June 3, 2008. Since the incumbent Sanders received a majority of primary votes, he was elected outright with no need for a runoff in the November general election.

Candidates
Jerry Sanders, incumbent mayor of San Diego  (Voter registration: Republican)
Steve Francis, businessman and mayoral candidate in 2005 (Voter registration: Republican)
Floyd L. Morrow, former member of the San Diego City Council and mayoral candidate in 1986 and 1988 (Voter registration: Democratic)
Eric M. Bidwell, T-shirt designer (No political affiliation)
James B. Hart, aircraft mechanic and perennial candidate (Voter registration: Republican)

Campaign
Fellow republican Steve Francis was considered the main opponent to incumbent Jerry Sanders by local reporters.  The race was notable for the open hostility between the two front-runners. Memorably, after an April debate in Balboa Park, instead of shaking Francis's hand, Sanders privately said "Fuck you, Steve" instead. Francis later reported the profanity to the local media. In response to questions about the incident, Sanders claimed that he was frustrated with Francis trying to "buy the office" with his personal fortune and conducting push polls impugning his record as mayor.

Primary election results

General election
Because Sanders won a majority of the votes in the June primary, there was no need for a runoff in the November general election.

References

2008 California elections
2008 United States mayoral elections
2008
2008